Georg Monsen (19 December 1922 – 10 April 2015) was a Norwegian former football midfielder and manager.

Playing career
Monsen played 147 games and scored 66 games for Viking FK. He also played for FC Nancy and Besançon in French Ligue 1 and Ligue 2.

Managerial career
He was the coach of Viking. He won the Norwegian Football Cup in 1953. He later had a stint in Stålkameratene.

References

1922 births
2015 deaths
Sportspeople from Stavanger
Association football midfielders
Norwegian footballers
Norwegian football managers
Norwegian expatriate footballers
Viking FK players
FC Nancy players
Ligue 1 players
Ligue 2 players
Racing Besançon players
Viking FK managers
Bryne FK managers
Expatriate footballers in France
Norwegian expatriate sportspeople in France